Šípy is a municipality and village in Rakovník District in the Central Bohemian Region of the Czech Republic. It has about 200 inhabitants.

Administrative parts
Villages of Bělbožice and Milíčov are administrative parts of Šípy.

References

Villages in Rakovník District